Maryam is a 2021 Maldivian political thriller film directed by Ibrahim Wisan. Produced by Hassan Shazil, Ahmed Zareer and Ibrahim Wisan under Ehkaaf Production, the film stars Mariyam Majudha in titular role while Ahmed Saeed, Ali Azim, Ali Shazleem and Roanu Hassan Manik feature in pivotal roles of the film. It narrates the journey of an ordinary woman to dethrone an influential politician representing her constituency.

Premise
Maryam (Mariyam Majudha), a strong and intelligent woman who manages her family including her supportive husband, Ihsaan (Ali Shazleem), daughter and sick father, while working ambitiously at the Health Post of the island, is introduced to the politics, as persuaded by her friends to defeat, Adhunan Haleem (Ahmed Saeed), the current MP representing their constituency. As soon as Maryam wins the primary election to represent the opposition party, the leader of the party, Ibrahim Naeem (Mohamed Waheed) is bribed by Haleem to call off the party seat, which puts an additional burden on Maryam financially. However, this does not stop Maryam from moving ahead with the political career as she registers to compete for the seat as an independent candidate.

Cast 
 Mariyam Majudha as Maryam Mohamed
 Ahmed Saeed as Adhunan Haleem
 Ali Azim as Ilhaam
 Ali Shazleem as Ihsaan Hussain
 Roanu Hassan Manik
 Aminath Nisha as Fareesha
 Maisharath Ahmed as Ameena
 Mohamed Waheed as Ibrahim Naeem
 Imran Mohamed as Solih
 Mariyam Lamsa Latheef as Ruha
 Arushad Nooree as Jaufar

Development
A political thriller titled Maryam was announced in March 2020 which marks Ibrahim Wisan's second direction after the film Vee Beyvafa (2016). The cast of the film was released shortly, which includes Mariyam Majudha, Ahmed Saeed, Ali Azim, Ali Shazleem and Roanu Hassan Manik in pivotal roles. The film marks Majudha's first feature film under a different studio other than Dark Rain Entertainment. In the film, she portrays the role of an empowering woman rising in a political mess. After completing the shoot in Male', the cast and crew departed to M. Mulah in early March 2020. Filming was completed on 29 March 2020. Post production of the film was carried out by Okeyz Ink. The film narrates the journey of an ordinary woman to dethrone an influential politician representing her constituency, Kandifaru Dhaaira, which consists of three islands, Kandifaru, Kaafushidhoo and Lonudhoo.

Soundtrack

Release
The film was scheduled for theatrical release in August 2020, but was postponed due to the COVID-19 pandemic. In March 2021, it was revealed that the film will not be released theatrically, instead it will be streamed through Medianet Multi Screen application as its premiere on 8 April 2021.

References

Maldivian thriller films
2021 films
Films postponed due to the COVID-19 pandemic
Films directed by Ibrahim Wisan

External links